Reynante Jamili (born December 21, 1972) is a Filipino former professional boxer. He's the former Philippines GAB and OPBF Super Bantamweight Champion.

Professional career

WBC Super Bantamweight Championship
In July 1999, Jamili was knocked out by WBC Super Bantamweight champion Érik Morales, in what would be Reynante's only shot at a World Championship.

After suffering a knockout loss to Juan Manuel Márquez, Jamili would go on to retire.

References

External links

Featherweight boxers
1972 births
Living people
People from Parañaque
Boxers from Metro Manila
Filipino male boxers